The Pataudi Palace, also called Ibrahim Kothi, is a palace of the former ruling family Pataudi family in Pataudi town of Gurgaon district (now Gurugram district) in Haryana state of India. Passed from the last ruling nawab, Iftikhar Ali Khan, to his son, the last recognized titular nawab, Mansoor Ali Khan, the palace is currently held by his son Saif Ali Khan, who is the current patriarch of the Pataudi family.

After the high-profile wedding between the nawab of Pataudi and the begum of Bhopal, the nawab felt the old family home was not grand enough to house his new bride in the manner she was accustomed. At the request of Iftikhar Ali Khan (1910–52), the 8th Nawab of Pataudi, the building was designed in the style of the colonial-era mansions of Imperial Delhi by Robert Tor Russell (1888–1972) assisted by the Karl Malte von Heinz.
 
Many Hindi movies have been shot in the palace.

The renovation was soon completed and the Pataudi family stays in the palace during winters.

Nearby Akbar Manzil, built after 1857 as the official residence of the then Nawab, was later converted into a kachahri (judicial complex), and is now used as a godown (store).

See also
Pataudi State

References 

Palaces in Haryana
Heritage hotels in India
History of Haryana
Buildings and structures in Gurgaon district
Pataudi